Luknimit Singklongsi is a Thai Muay Thai fighter.

Biography and career 
Luknimit started Muay Thai at only 6 years old, inspired by his oldest brother who was already well known at the time.

Born into the Popiam family, he has four brothers, all of whom were accomplished boxers. His oldest brother, Charnsak Singklongsi was a Lumpinee Stadium Champion at 108 lbs and beat Saenchai multiple times. Another brother, Taweesak Singklongsi was a Lumpinee Stadium Champion and S1 World Champion at 108 lbs. Taweesak's twin, Taweeporn was a boxing Champion of Hong Kong. Luknimit's youngest brother, Khochasarn Singklongsi had a notable knockout win over Namsaknoi Yudthagarngamtorn and once fought for the Lumpinee Stadium title against Attachai Fairtex. Khochasarn died at 23 years old due to a motorcycle accident.

Luknimit started his career at the infamous Lukprabat camp in Saraburi Province, but soon moved to the Singklongsi camp with his brothers, in his hometown of Lopburi where he has stayed for over 20 years.

Luknimit has been ranked n°1 at both Rajadamnern Stadium and Lumpinee Stadium multiple times in his long career.

At his best, he has beaten Wanheng Menayothin, Norasing Lukbanyai, Thongchai Tor.Silachai, Kaimukkao Por.Thairongruangkamai, Kaonar P.K.Saenchaimuaythaigym, Thanonchai Thanakorngym, Superbank Mor.Ratanabandit, Thaksinlek Kiatniwat, Chorfah Tor.Sangtiennoi, Prajanchai P.K.Saenchaimuaythaigym, and Suakim P.K.Saenchaimuaythaigym.

Titles and accomplishments 

 Rajadamnern Stadium 108 lbs Champion
 2007 WMC 108 lbs World Champion
 2022 Onesongchai S-1 Junior Lightweight Champion

Fight record 

|- style="background:#;"
|2023-01-19
|
| align="left" | Petchwanchai Wor.Sangprapai
|Petchyindee, Rajadamnern Stadium
|Bangkok, Thailand
|
|
|

|- style="background:#fbb;"
|2022-12-13
|Loss
| align="left" | Promrob Nor.Nophiran
|Chang Muay Thai Onesongchaisanjorn
|Saraburi province, Thailand
|Decision (Unanimous)
|5
|3:00
|-
! colspan="9" style="background:white" |

|- style="background:#c5d2ea;"
|2022-10-02
|Draw
| align="left" | YodSiam SorJor.Vichitpadriew
|Muaydee VitheeThai + Jitmuangnon, OrTorGor.3 Stadium
|Nonthaburi province, Thailand
|Decision
|5
|3:00

|- style="background:#cfc;"
|2022-07-31
|Win
| align="left" | Deuan Jitmuangnon
|Muaydee VitheeThai + Jitmuangnon, OrTorGor.3 Stadium
|Nonthaburi province, Thailand
|Decision
|5
|3:00

|- style="background:#fbb;"
|2022-07-04
|Loss
| align="left" | Yodkitsada Sor.Sommai
|Muay Thai Pantamit, Thupatemi Stadium
|Pathum Thani, Thailand
|Decision
|5
|3:00

|- style="background:#cfc;"
|2022-05-07
|Win
| align="left" | Muangsap NayokwitThungSong
|Omnoi Stadium
|Samut Sakhon, Thailand
|Decision
|5
|3:00

|- style="background:#cfc;"
|2022-03-26
|Win
| align="left" | Nawaek Sitchefboontham
|Onesongchai, OrTorGor.3 Stadium
|Nonthaburi province, Thailand
|Decision
|5
|3:00
|-
! colspan="9" style="background:white" |

|- style="background:#cfc;"
|2022-02-24
|Win
| align="left" | Apiwat Sor.Somnuk
|Onesongchai
|Chachoengsao province, Thailand
|Decision
|5
|3:00
|-
! colspan="9" style="background:white" |

|- style="background:#fbb;"
|2021-11-28
|Loss
| align="left" | Apiwat Sor.Somnuk
|Muaydeevitheethai, Blue Arena
|Samut Prakan, Thailand
|Decision
|5
|3:00
|- style="background:#fbb;"
|2021-02-14
|Loss
| align="left" | Thongsiam Muadwititchiangmai
|Blue Arena
|Samut Prakan, Thailand
|Decision
|5
|3:00
|- style="background:#fbb;"
|2020-11-07
|Loss
| align="left" | Chorfah Tor.Sangtiennoi
|SAT HERO SERIES, World Siam Stadium
|Bangkok, Thailand
|KO
|3
|
|- style="text-align:center; background:#fbb;"
|2020-10-03
|Loss
| align="left" | Prajanban Sor.Jor.Wichitmuangpradriew
|Or.Tor.Gor.3 Stadium
|Nonthaburi, Thailand
|Decision
|5
|3:00
|- style="background:#cfc;"
|2020-09-06
|Win
| align="left" | Khanongsuk Kor.Kampanat
|Blue Arena
|Samut Prakan, Thailand
|Decision
|5
|3:00
|- style="background:#cfc;"
|2020-08-08
|Win
| align="left" | Thongsiam MuadwititChiangMai
|Thanakorn Stadium
|Nakhon Pathom, Thailand
|Decision
|5
|3:00
|- style="background:#cfc;"
|2020-07-18
|Win
| align="left" | KomAwut F.A.Group
|Thanakorn Stadium
|Nakhon Pathom, Thailand
|Decision
|5
|3:00
|- style="background:#fbb;"
|2020-02-24
|Loss
| align="left" | Gingsanglek Tor.Laksong
|Rajadamnern Stadium
|Bangkok, Thailand
|Decision
|5
|3:00
|- style="background:#cfc;"
|2020-01-13
|Win
| align="left" | Hercules Phetsimean
|Rajadamnern Stadium
|Bangkok, Thailand
|Decision
|5
|3:00
|- style="background:#cfc;"
|2019-12-12
|Win
| align="left" | Hercules Phetsimean
|Rajadamnern Stadium
|Bangkok, Thailand
|Decision
|5
|3:00
|- style="background:#cfc;"
|2019-11-07
|Win
| align="left" | Kumantong Jitmuangnon
|Rajadamnern Stadium
|Bangkok, Thailand
|Decision
|5
|3:00
|- style="background:#cfc;"
|2019-10-07
|Win
| align="left" | Masuk Or.Bor.Tor.Kampi
|Rajadamnern Stadium
|Bangkok, Thailand
|KO
|3
|
|- style="text-align:center; background:#fbb;"
|2019-08-29
|Loss
| align="left" | Apiwat Sor.Somnuk
|Rajadamnern Stadium
|Bangkok, Thailand
|Decision
|5
|3:00
|- style="background:#fbb;"
|2019-08-07
|Loss
| align="left" | Kumantong Jitmuangnon
|Rajadamnern Stadium
|Bangkok, Thailand
|Decision
|5
|3:00
|- style="background:#c5d2ea;"
|2019-06-24
|Draw
| align="left" | Yodkhuntab Sor.Kor.Sungaigym
|Rajadamnern Stadium
|Bangkok, Thailand
|Decision
|5
|3:00
|- style="background:#cfc;"
|2019-05-25
|Win
| align="left" | Phetkriangkrai Tor.Silachai
|Thanakorn Stadium
|Nakhon Pathom, Thailand
|Decision
|5
|3:00
|- style="background:#fbb;"
|2019-03-28
|Loss
| align="left" | Apiwat Sor.Somnuk
|Rajadamnern Stadium
|Bangkok, Thailand
|Decision
|5
|3:00
|- style="background:#fbb;"
|2019-02-28
|Loss
| align="left" | Suriyanlek Or.Bor.Tor.Kampi
|Rajadamnern Stadium
|Bangkok, Thailand
|Decision
|5
|3:00
|- style="background:#fbb;"
|2019-01-14
|Loss
| align="left" | Apiwat Sor.Somnuk
|Rajadamnern Stadium
|Bangkok, Thailand
|Decision
|5
|3:00
|- style="background:#cfc;"
|2018-12-13
|Win
| align="left" | Yodkhuntab Sor.Kor.Sungaigym
|Rajadamnern Stadium
|Bangkok, Thailand
|Decision
|5
|3:00
|- style="background:#cfc;"
|2018-11-21
|Win
| align="left" | Yodkhuntab Sor.Kor.Sungaigym
|Rajadamnern Stadium
|Bangkok, Thailand
|Decision
|5
|3:00
|- style="background:#fbb;"
|2018-10-30
|Loss
| align="left" | Messi Pangkongpap
|Rajadamnern Stadium
|Bangkok, Thailand
|Decision
|5
|3:00
|- style="background:#fbb;"
|2018-09-20
|Loss
| align="left" | Kiewpayak Jitmuangnon
|Rajadamnern Stadium
|Bangkok, Thailand
|Decision
|5
|3:00
|- style="background:#fbb;"
|2018-08-06
|Loss
| align="left" | Chorfah Tor.Sangtiennoi
|Rajadamnern Stadium
|Bangkok, Thailand
|Decision
|5
|3:00
|- style="background:#cfc;"
|2018-06-21
|Win
| align="left" | Pakkalek Tor.Laksong
|Rajadamnern Stadium
|Bangkok, Thailand
|Decision
|5
|3:00
|- style="background:#cfc;"
|2018-05-02
|Win
| align="left" | Morakot Mor.Rattanabandit
|Rajadamnern Stadium
|Bangkok, Thailand
|Decision
|5
|3:00
|- style="background:#fbb;"
|2018-04-02
|Loss
| align="left" | Chorfah Tor.Sangtiennoi
|Rajadamnern Stadium
|Bangkok, Thailand
|Decision
|5
|3:00
|- style="background:#c5d2ea;"
|2018-02-14
|Draw
| align="left" | Chorfah Tor.Sangtiennoi
|Rajadamnern Stadium
|Bangkok, Thailand
|Decision
|5
|3:00
|- style="background:#cfc;"
|2018-01-24
|Win
| align="left" | Ploywitthaya Petsimuen
|Rajadamnern Stadium
|Bangkok, Thailand
|Decision
|5
|3:00
|- style="background:#fbb;"
|2017-12-07
|Loss
| align="left" | Ploywitthaya Petsimuen
|Rajadamnern Stadium
|Bangkok, Thailand
|Decision
|5
|3:00
|- style="background:#fbb;"
|2017-11-02
|Loss
| align="left" | Pakkalek Tor.Laksong
|Rajadamnern Stadium
|Bangkok, Thailand
|KO
|3
|
|- style="text-align:center; background:#fbb;"
|2017-09-06
|Loss
| align="left" | Morakot Mor.Rattanabandit
|Rajadamnern Stadium
|Bangkok, Thailand
|Decision
|5
|3:00
|- style="background:#cfc;"
|2017-07-13
|Win
| align="left" | KomAwut F.A.Group
|Rajadamnern Stadium
|Bangkok, Thailand
|Decision
|5
|3:00
|- style="background:#fbb;"
|2017-06-07
|Loss
| align="left" | Chanasuk Kor.Kampanat
|Rajadamnern Stadium
|Bangkok, Thailand
|Decision
|5
|3:00
|- style="background:#fbb;"
|2017-05-03
|Loss
| align="left" | Ploywitthaya Petsimuen
|Rajadamnern Stadium
|Bangkok, Thailand
|Decision
|5
|3:00
|- style="background:#fbb;"
|2017-03-30
|Loss
| align="left" | Chorfah Tor.Sangtiennoi
|Rajadamnern Stadium
|Bangkok, Thailand
|Decision
|5
|3:00
|- style="background:#c2d5ea;"
|2017-02-22
|Draw
| align="left" | Morakot Mor.Rattanabandit
|Rajadamnern Stadium
|Bangkok, Thailand
|Decision
|5
|3:00
|- style="background:#fbb;"
|2017-01-30
|Loss
| align="left" | Morakot Mor.Rattanabandit
|Rajadamnern Stadium
|Bangkok, Thailand
|Decision
|5
|3:00
|-  style="background:#fbb;"
| 2017-01-12|| Loss||align=left| Chorfah Tor.Sangtiennoi  ||  Rajadamnern Stadium || Bangkok, Thailand || Decision || 5 || 3:00
|- style="background:#fbb;"
|2016-12-15
|Loss
| align="left" | Khunhan Chor.Hapayak
|Rajadamnern Stadium
|Bangkok, Thailand
|Decision
|5
|3:00
|- style="background:#cfc;"
|2016-11-19
|Win
| align="left" | Khunhan Chor.Hapayak
|Montree Studio
|Bangkok, Thailand
|Decision
|5
|3:00
|- style="background:#cfc;"
|2016-10-13
|Win
| align="left" | Yodmongkhol Muangsima
|Rajadamnern Stadium
|Bangkok, Thailand
|Decision
|5
|3:00
|- style="background:#fbb;"
|2016-09-14
|Loss
| align="left" | Phonpanlan P.K.Saenchaimuaythaigym
|Rajadamnern Stadium
|Bangkok, Thailand
|Decision
|5
|3:00
|- style="background:#cfc;"
|2016-08-04
|Win
| align="left" | Phetmuangchon Sudsakornmuaythai
|Rajadamnern Stadium
|Bangkok, Thailand
|Decision
|5
|3:00
|- style="background:#cfc;"
|2016-07-08
|Win
| align="left" | Suakim P.K.Saenchaimuaythaigym
|Lumpinee Stadium
|Bangkok, Thailand
|Decision
|5
|3:00
|- style="background:#fbb;"
|2016-06-12
|Loss
| align="left" | Suakim P.K.Saenchaimuaythaigym
|Rangsit Boxing Stadium
|Rangsit, Thailand
|Decision
|5
|3:00
|- style="background:#cfc;"
|2016-05-19
|Win
| align="left" | Ploywitthaya Petsimuen
|Rajadamnern Stadium
|Bangkok, Thailand
|Decision
|5
|3:00
|- style="background:#cfc;"
|2016-03-31
|Win
| align="left" | Prajanchai P.K.Saenchaimuaythaigym
|Rajadamnern Stadium
|Bangkok, Thailand
|Decision
|5
|3:00
|- style="background:#cfc;"
|2016-03-05
|Win
| align="left" | Ploywitthaya Petsimuen
|Montree Studio
|Bangkok, Thailand
|Decision
|5
|3:00
|- style="background:#cfc;"
|2016-02-06
|Win
| align="left" | Chanasuk Kor.Kampanat
|Siam Omnoi Stadium
|Samut Sakhon, Thailand
|Decision
|5
|3:00
|- style="background:#fbb;"
|2015-11-07
|Loss
| align="left" | Changsuk Kiatsongrit
|Montree Studio
|Bangkok, Thailand
|Decision
|5
|3:00
|- style="background:#fbb;"
|2015-10-14
|Loss
| align="left" | Chorfah Tor.Sangtiennoi
|Rajadamnern Stadium
|Bangkok, Thailand
|Decision
|5
|3:00
|- style="background:#fbb;"
|2015-09-05
|Loss
| align="left" | Yodmongkhol Muangsima
|Montree Studio
|Bangkok, Thailand
|Decision
|5
|3:00
|- style="background:#fbb;"
|2015-08-10
|Loss
| align="left" | Yodmongkhol Muangsima
|Rajadamnern Stadium
|Bangkok, Thailand
|Decision
|5
|3:00
|- style="background:#fbb;"
|2015-07-09
|Loss
| align="left" | Phetlamsin Chor.Hapayak
|Rajadamnern Stadium
|Bangkok, Thailand
|Decision
|5
|3:00
|- style="background:#cfc;"
|2015-06-04
|Win
| align="left" | Yodmongkhol Tor.Laksong
|Rajadamnern Stadium
|Bangkok, Thailand
|Decision
|5
|3:00
|- style="background:#fbb;"
|2015-05-07
|Loss
| align="left" | Pakkalek Tor.Laksong
|Rajadamnern Stadium
|Bangkok, Thailand
|Decision
|5
|3:00
|- style="background:#fbb;"
|2015-03-30
|Loss
| align="left" | Pakkalek Tor.Laksong
|Rajadamnern Stadium
|Bangkok, Thailand
|Decision
|5
|3:00
|- style="background:#fbb;"
|2015-02-12
|Loss
| align="left" | Prajanchai P.K.Saenchaimuaythaigym
|Rajadamnern Stadium
|Bangkok, Thailand
|Decision
|5
|3:00
|- style="background:#fbb;"
|2015-01-08
|Loss
| align="left" | Panpayak Jitmuangnon
|Rajadamnern Stadium
|Bangkok, Thailand
|Decision
|5
|3:00
|- style="background:#cfc;"
|2014-12-01
|Win
| align="left" | Phetlamsin Sor.Sungaigym
|Rajadamnern Stadium
|Bangkok, Thailand
|Decision
|5
|3:00
|- style="background:#cfc;"
|2014-10-08
|Win
| align="left" | Prajanchai Por.Phetnamtong
|Rajadamnern Stadium
|Bangkok, Thailand
|Decision
|5
|3:00
|- style="background:#fbb;"
|2014-09-11
|Loss
| align="left" | Surachai Srisuriyanyothin
|Rajadamnern Stadium
|Bangkok, Thailand
|Decision
|5
|3:00
|- style="background:#cfc;"
|2014-08-14
|Win
| align="left" | Sangmanee Sor Tienpo
|Rajadamnern Stadium
|Bangkok, Thailand
|Decision
|5
|3:00
|- style="background:#cfc;"
|2014-07-16
|Win
| align="left" | Chorfah Tor.Sangtiennoi
|Rajadamnern Stadium
|Bangkok, Thailand
|Decision
|5
|3:00
|- style="background:#c5d2ea;"
|2014-06-25
|Draw
| align="left" | Chorfah Tor.Sangtiennoi
|Rajadamnern Stadium
|Bangkok, Thailand
|Decision
|5
|3:00
|- style="background:#cfc;"
|2013-12-02
|Win
| align="left" | Thaksinlek Kiatniwat
|Lumpinee Stadium
|Bangkok, Thailand
|Decision
|5
|3:00
|- style="background:#fbb;"
|2013-11-06
|Loss
| align="left" | Fonluang Sitboonmee
|Rajadamnern Stadium
|Bangkok, Thailand
|Decision
|5
|3:00
|- style="background:#cfc;"
|2013-05-23
|Win
| align="left" | Naka Kaewsamrit
|Rajadamnern Stadium
|Bangkok, Thailand
|Decision
|5
|3:00
|- style="background:#fbb;"
|2012-10-29
|Loss
| align="left" | Thanonchai Thanakorngym
|Rajadamnern Stadium
|Bangkok, Thailand
|Decision
|5
|3:00
|-  style="background:#fbb;"
| 2012-09-18 || Loss ||align=left| Phet Utong Or. Kwanmuang || Lumpinee Stadium || Bangkok, Thailand || Decision || 5 || 3:00
|- style="background:#fbb;"
|2012-08-24
|Loss
| align="left" | Newwangchan Pakornpornsurin
|Lumpinee Stadium
|Bangkok, Thailand
|Decision
|5
|3:00
|- style="background:#fbb;"
|2012-07-20
|Loss
| align="left" | Nongbeer Chokngamwong
|Rajadamnern Stadium
|Bangkok, Thailand
|KO
|3
|
|- style="text-align:center; background:#fbb;"
|2012-01-26
|Loss
| align="left" | Yodwicha Por.Boonsit
|Rajadamnern Stadium
|Bangkok, Thailand
|Decision
|5
|3:00
|- style="background:#fbb;"
|2011-12-22
|Loss
| align="left" | Rungrat Tor.Pitakornlakarn
|Rajadamnern Stadium
|Bangkok, Thailand
|Decision
|5
|3:00
|- style="background:#cfc;"
|2011-10-20
|Win
| align="left" | Singsuriya Alloysrinakorn
|Rajadamnern Stadium
|Bangkok, Thailand
|Decision
|5
|3:00
|- style="background:#cfc;"
|2011-08-08
|Win
| align="left" | Pajonsuk Por.Pramuk
|Rajadamnern Stadium
|Bangkok, Thailand
|TKO
|1
|
|- style="text-align:center; background:#cfc;"
|2011-03-15
|Win
| align="left" | Superbank Sakchaichot
|Lumpinee Stadium
|Bangkok, Thailand
|Decision
|5
|3:00
|- style="background:#cfc;"
|2011-01-21
|Win
| align="left" | Thanonchai Thanakorngym
|Lumpinee Stadium
|Bangkok, Thailand
|Decision
|5
|3:00
|- style="background:#cfc;"
|2010-04-06
|Win
| align="left" | Kungwanlek Petchyindee
|Lumpinee Stadium
|Bangkok, Thailand
|Decision
|5
|3:00
|- style="background:#cfc;"
|2010-03-02
|Win
| align="left" | Nongbeer Chokngamwong
|Lumpinee Stadium
|Bangkok, Thailand
|Decision
|5
|3:00
|- style="background:#cfc;"
|2009-11-23
|Win
| align="left" | Orono Sitbenjama
|Rajadamnern Stadium
|Bangkok, Thailand
|Decision
|5
|3:00
|- style="background:#fbb;"
|2009-09-30
|Loss
| align="left" | Pudpadnoi Muangsima
|Rajadamnern Stadium
|Bangkok, Thailand
|Decision
|5
|3:00
|- style="background:#cfc;"
|2009-08-06
|Win
| align="left" | Thongchai Tor. Silachai
|Rajadamnern Stadium
|Bangkok, Thailand
|TKO (Cut)
|4
|
|- style="text-align:center; background:#cfc;"
|2009-07-09
|Win
| align="left" | Ponkrit Nampatahoymuk
|Rajadamnern Stadium
|Bangkok, Thailand
|Decision
|5
|3:00
|- style="background:#fbb;"
|2009-02-26
|Loss
| align="left" | Pakorn Sakyothin
|Rajadamnern Stadium
|Bangkok, Thailand
|Decision
|5
|3:00
|- style="background:#cfc;"
|2009-01-14
|Win
| align="left" | Chartchainoi Sitbenjama
|Rajadamnern Stadium
|Bangkok, Thailand
|Decision
|5
|3:00

|-  style="background:#fbb;"
| 2008-09-13|| Loss ||align=left| Kaimukkao Sit.Or || Onesongchai || Bangkok, Thailand || Decision  || 5 || 3:00

|- style="background:#fbb;"
|2008-08-07
|Loss
| align="left" | Chartchainoi Sitbenjama
|Rajadamnern Stadium
|Bangkok, Thailand
|Decision
|5
|3:00
|- style="background:#cfc;"
|2008-07-10
|Win
| align="left" | Kaimukkao Sit.Or
|Rajadamnern Stadium
|Bangkok, Thailand
|TKO
|5
|
|- style="text-align:center; background:#fbb;"
|2008-06-19
|Loss
| align="left" | Pakorn Sakyothin
|Rajadamnern Stadium
|Bangkok, Thailand
|Decision
|5
|3:00
|- style="background:#fbb;"
|2008-05-01
|Loss
| align="left" | Rittijak Kaewsamrit
|Rajadamnern Stadium
|Bangkok, Thailand
|Decision
|5
|3:00
|- style="background:#cfc;"
|2008-04-10
|Win
| align="left" | Thongchai Tor. Silachai
|Rajadamnern Stadium
|Bangkok, Thailand
|Decision
|5
|3:00
|- style="background:#fbb;"
|2008-02-07
|Loss
| align="left" | Kaimookdam Sit.Or
|Rajadamnern Stadium
|Bangkok, Thailand
|Decision
|5
|3:00
|- style="background:#fbb;"
| 2007-10-30|| Loss|| align=left| Thongchai Tor.Silachai || Rajadamnern Stadium || Bangkok, Thailand || Decision || 5 ||3:00
|- style="background:#c5d2ea;"
|2007-06-07
|Draw
| align="left" | Kwanpichit 13Rienexpress
|Rajadamnern Stadium
|Bangkok, Thailand
|Decision
|5
|3:00
|- style="background:#cfc;"
|2007-05-07
|Win
| align="left" | Harnchai Kiatyongyut
|Rajadamnern Stadium
|Bangkok, Thailand
|Decision
|5
|3:00
|- style="background:#cfc;"
|2007-03-08
|Win
| align="left" | Fahsang Tor.Pitakchai
|Rajadamnern Stadium
|Bangkok, Thailand
|Decision
|5
|3:00
|-
! colspan="9" style="background:white" |
|- style="background:#cfc;"
|2007-01-22
|Win
| align="left" | Palangpon Piriyanoppachai
|Rajadamnern Stadium
|Bangkok, Thailand
|Decision
|5
|3:00
|- style="background:#cfc;"
|2006-12-26
|Win
| align="left" | Fahsang Tor.Pitakchai
|Rajadamnern Stadium
|Bangkok, Thailand
|Decision
|5
|3:00
|- style="background:#cfc;"
|2006-10-19
|Win
| align="left" | Cobarnoi Sitnamkabuan
|Rajadamnern Stadium
|Bangkok, Thailand
|Decision
|5
|3:00
|- style="background:#cfc;"
|2006-07-20
|Win
| align="left" | Kaimookdam Pomkhwannarong
|Rajadamnern Stadium
|Bangkok, Thailand
|Decision
|5
|3:00
|- style="background:#cfc;"
|2006-05-08
|Win
| align="left" | Phetsanguan Sitniwat
|Rajadamnern Stadium
|Bangkok, Thailand
|Decision
|5
|3:00
|- style="background:#fbb;"
|2006-03-06
|Loss
| align="left" | Kaimookdam Pomkhwannarong
|Rajadamnern Stadium
|Bangkok, Thailand
|Decision
|5
|3:00
|- style="background:#fbb;"
|2005-12-22
|Loss
| align="left" | Norasing Lukbanyai
|Rajadamnern Stadium
|Bangkok, Thailand
|Decision
|5
|3:00
|- style="background:#fbb;"
|2005-11-16
|Loss
| align="left" | Linglom Tor.Chalermchai
|Rajadamnern Stadium
|Bangkok, Thailand
|Decision
|5
|3:00
|- style="background:#cfc;"
|2005-07-28
|Win
| align="left" | Palangpon Piriyanoppachai
|Rajadamnern Stadium
|Bangkok, Thailand
|Decision
|5
|3:00
|- style="background:#cfc;"
|2005-06-24
|Win
| align="left" | Norasing Lukbanyai
|Lumpinee Stadium
|Bangkok, Thailand
|Decision
|5
|3:00
|- style="background:#fbb;"
|2005-03-14
|Loss
| align="left" | Idoo 13Rienexpress
|Rajadamnern Stadium
|Bangkok, Thailand
|Decision
|5
|3:00

|- style="background:#fbb;"
|2005-01-20
|Loss
| align="left" | Palangpon Piriyanoppachai
|Rajadamnern Stadium
|Bangkok, Thailand
|Decision
|5
|3:00

|- style="background:#fbb;"
|2004-08-16
|Loss
| align="left" | Weraburutthai Saksomchai
|Rajadamnern Stadium
|Bangkok, Thailand
|Decision
|5
|3:00
|- style="background:#cfc;"
|2004-07-19
|Win
| align="left" | Binlar Menayothin
|Rajadamnern Stadium
|Bangkok, Thailand
|Decision
|5
|3:00
|- style="background:#cfc;"
|2004-02-18
|Win
| align="left" | Fahrungruang Sor.Poonsawat
|Rajadamnern Stadium
|Bangkok, Thailand
|Decision
|5
|3:00
|- style="background:#cfc;"
|2003-10-30
|Win
| align="left" | Wanheng Menayothin
|Rajadamnern Stadium
|Bangkok, Thailand
|Decision
|5
|3:00

|- style="background:#fbb;"
|2002-10-23
|Loss
| align="left" | Petchdam Sitchamong
|Rajadamnern Stadium
|Bangkok, Thailand
|Decision
|5
|3:00
|-
| colspan=9 | Legend:

References 

1986 births
Luknimit Singklongsi
Living people
Luknimit Singklongsi
Luknimit Singklongsi